Marianna Laba, born 7 September 1968) is a Ukrainian singer (soprano), Merited Artist of Ukraine, soloist of Lviv State Philharmonic and The Lviv House of Chamber and Organ music.

Biography
Marianna Laba was born on 7 September in Serebryanye Prudy, near Moscow in a family of professional musicians. Her father, originally from Chernivtsi region, was the headmaster of a music school then. Her mother, who was a Hungarian origin, sang in the choir led by the father. A few years later the family returned to Ukraine to settle in the town of Khust, Zakarpattia region.

Marianna has been playing music since she was four. She studied to play the violin and the piano.

From 1983 until 1987, she studied at Uzhhorod Music College, the violinist department. After she had graduated with excellent grades, she received a degree of an orchestra artist and the teacher of music. From 1987 until 1995, she studied at Lviv State Conservatory named after M.V.Lysenko at the department of opera and chamber singing.

Since 1996, she has been the soloist of Lviv State Philharmonic, as well as the one of Lviv House of Organ and Chamber music (since 2002).
Currently lives in Lviv, raising a son Christian.

Music career
As a student, being the soloist of "Krynytsia" and "Excelsior" bands, she toured Austria, Germany and Canada.
While she was studying in Philharmonic, she participated in "Das Treffen" festival (Bayreuth 1992–1994), and in 1998 in the "Kommern Oper Gettingen" concerts in Germany. In 2000, she toured Italy together with Lviv National Opera and Ballet theatre named after S.Krushelnitska.

She represented Ukraine on the numerous polish festivals, as well as on international festivals and forums in Austria, Germany, Canada, Czech Republic, Hungary, France, Portugal, Denmark, Norway, Germany. From 2008 until 2009, Marianna toured the cities of Spain with Academic symphonic orchestra of Lviv Philharmonic led by Aydar Torybayev within the program "Gala Strauss".

Marianna's heritage includes numerous programmes, accompanied with organ, such as A.Vivaldi, J.S.Bach, G.F.Gendel, baroque music by D.Scarlatti, G.Paisiello, D.Pergolesi, A.Stradella, D.Cimarosa, F.Tostti and others.
She collaborated with such conductors, as Yezhy Kozek, Woitek Mrozek (Poland), Dieter Wagner (Germany), Mattias Kendlinger (Austria), Gungardt Mattes (Switzerland), Yuriy Lutsiv, Serhiy Burko, Volodymyr Syvohip, Gennadiy Fis'kov, Roman Fylypchuk, Myron Yusypovich (Ukraine), Aydar Torybayev (Kazakhstan).
Also she participated in Ukrainian-Polish project, supported by the president of Polish republic of staging the oratory of M.Soltys "Jan-Kazymyr's Oaths".

Marianna Laba is an active participant of the national celebrations in Budapest, Hungary. As the artist, she represented Ukraine in Canadian and Belarusian embassies. She speaks 7 languages and does the translations of vocal parties of classical pieces from foreign languages into Ukrainian one.

Since 2007 Marianna has revealed another side of music creativity. She became a lead singer of Lviv gothic metal band Polynove Pole ("The wormwood field"). That enabled her to attempt a new and more dynamic modern style of music. And the band itself moved to a higher level of creative activity and onstage performance.

References

External links
 Lviv Philharmonic

1968 births
Living people
People from Serebryano-Prudsky District
20th-century Ukrainian women singers
Ukrainian heavy metal singers
21st-century Ukrainian women singers
Recipients of the title of Merited Artist of Ukraine
Women heavy metal singers